Navin Samarasinghe (born 5 June 1982) is a former Sri Lankan male squash player. He has been a Sri Lankan national squash champion on 8 occasions. (1999, 2000, 2005, 2008, 2009, 2010, 2011, 2012)

Samarasinghe has represented the nation in the 2006 Asian Games and at the 2010 Asian Games.

References 

1982 births
Living people
Sri Lankan male squash players
Sportspeople from Colombo
Squash players at the 2006 Asian Games
Squash players at the 2010 Asian Games
Squash players at the 2010 Commonwealth Games
Commonwealth Games competitors for Sri Lanka
Asian Games competitors for Sri Lanka